Det kimer nu til julefest (The Happy Christmas Comes Once More) is a Danish Christmas carol.  The lyrics were written by the Danish poet N.F.S. Grundtvig in 1817, and the music was composed by Carl Christian Nicolaj Balle in 1850.

Notable recordings have been made by Swedish singer Sven-Olof Sandberg (1905-1974) and Norwegian soloist Olav Werner (1913-1992).

A number of adaptations of the song into English exist.  The earliest, entitled The Bells of Christmas Chime Once More, was translated by Charles P. Krauth in 1867.  A later adaptation bore the title O Fir Tree Dark, and was recorded by Bing Crosby in 1947. Another translation is The Happy Christmas Comes Once More by Charles Porterfield Krauth.

See also
 List of Christmas carols

References

1817 songs
Christmas carols
19th-century Christian texts
Danish Christian hymns
19th-century hymns